Louisiana Highway 122 (LA 122) is a state highway located in Grant Parish, Louisiana.  It runs  in an east–west direction from the junction of U.S. Highway 71 (US 71) and LA 1239-1 in Montgomery to LA 123 in Dry Prong.

The highway traverses a thickly forested area between the town of Montgomery and the village of Dry Prong, two small municipalities in Grant Parish, located in the central portion of the state.  Along its route, LA 122 passes through the small rural communities of Hargis, Verda, and Faircloth.  The eastern portion of the route between Lake Iatt and Dry Prong is largely located within the Kisatchie National Forest.

Route description
From the west, LA 122 begins at an intersection with US 71 in Montgomery, a small town in Grant Parish.  The intersection is also a junction with LA 1239-1 (Old Jefferson Highway), a minor local route.  LA 122 heads northeast from Montgomery into a thickly wooded rural area.  Over the next , small clusters of homes sporadically line the highway at such points as the tiny community of Hargis.  As it approaches the Winn Parish line, LA 122 curves to the southeast through the twin communities of Verda and New Verda.  Here, the highway intersects LA 1240, which heads due south to a point on US 71 near Aloha.  Shortly afterward, LA 122 begins a brief concurrency with LA 471, which heads north toward Winnfield, the seat of neighboring Winn Parish.  Just beyond New Verda, LA 471 continues ahead to the south while LA 122 turns eastward onto an intersecting road.

The surroundings become more sparsely populated as the highway passes along the north side of Lake Iatt, which contains a game and fish preserve. About  beyond the turn-off, LA 122 curves sharply to the south before resuming an eastward course through an area known as Faircloth. The route then turns southeast into the Catahoula Ranger District of the Kisatchie National Forest. LA 122 winds its way through the piney woods for another  before entering the village of Dry Prong.

Route classification and data
LA 122 is an undivided two-lane highway for its entire length.  The highway is classified as a rural major collector by the Louisiana Department of Transportation and Development (La DOTD).  Daily traffic volume in 2013 averaged between 800 and 1,040 vehicles.  The posted speed limit is generally , reduced as low as  through populated areas.

History

Pre-1955 route numbering

In the original Louisiana Highway system in use between 1921 and 1955, the modern LA 122 was part of two largely concurrent routes.  The majority of what is now LA 122 was originally part of State Route 162, an addition to the state highway system that was designated by an act of the state legislature in 1926.

The route followed the modern LA 122 from Montgomery to Faircloth but rather than continuing into Dry Prong, it turned northeast onto what is now Parish Road 11 (Landfill Road) to a point on US 167 (pre-1955 State Route 99) near Williana.

Two years later, State Route 475 was established along the same alignment between Montgomery and Faircloth but with a terminus in Dry Prong rather than Williana.

As the more detailed legislative description for Route 475 indicates, Montgomery and Verda were located along the Jefferson Highway and Pershing Highway, respectively.  These were two important auto trails that pre-dated the numbered U.S. Highway system.  In 1926, US 71 was routed along the Jefferson Highway (State Route 1) through Montgomery, and US 167 was routed along the Pershing Highway (State Route 5) through Verda.  The western portion of Route 162-475 that connected the new U.S. highways was gravelled around 1929.  However, US 167 was shifted onto its present alignment through Dry Prong in 1932, allowing a more direct route between Alexandria and Winnfield.  Soon afterward, the gravel road was extended eastward to Dry Prong along Route 475, which became the main traffic route, while the eastern portion of Route 162 between Faircloth and Williana remained unimproved.  Route 162 was dropped from the state highway system prior to the 1955 Louisiana Highway renumbering, leaving the entire length between Montgomery and Dry Prong as Route 475 only.  Paving of the Montgomery–Verda and Faircloth–Dry Prong sections of Route 475 was completed about 1954, leaving only the gap between Verda and Faircloth as a gravel road at the time of the renumbering.

Post-1955 route history
LA 122 was created in 1955 as a direct renumbering of former State Route 475.

Since the 1955 renumbering, the route of LA 122 has remained virtually the same.  Only minor changes have resulted from the smoothing of several curves over the years.  The biggest improvement to the route occurred early on when the last section of gravel highway between Verda and Faircloth was paved around 1957.

Major intersections

Notes

See also

References

External links

Maps / GIS Data Homepage, Louisiana Department of Transportation and Development

0122
Transportation in Grant Parish, Louisiana